SchleFaZ [] ("The worst movies ever/of all times") is a satirical film series of the German private broadcaster Tele 5. In this series, mainly B-movies, which are characterized by particularly bad workmanship or unintentionally funny ideas, are introduced, commented on and presented by Oliver Kalkofe and Peter Rütten. These films themselves are called Schlefaze.

In 2013, Kalkofe and fellow comedian Peter Rütten created and began hosting the still-running show SchleFaZ on Tele 5, which is loosely based on the format of American TV series Mystery Science Theater 3000. The name "SchleFaZ" is a pun on "GröFaZ" (roughly, "Greatest field commander of all time"; the German word Feldherr has no exact English equivalent), a derogatory nickname for Adolf Hitler. The title is also a reference to the former slogan of the German TV-Station Kabel 1, which was "Die besten Filme aller Zeiten" (The best movies of all time).

In it, Kalkofe and Rütten present trash films, introduce them with various background information, after every commercial break comment on the plot so far, and in the end summarize upon it, all within a retro-styled studio decorated in reference to the current film they're commenting on. The show has become an instant surprise hit for Tele 5, being the channel's leading show in ratings (with Kalkofe's other show Kalkofes Mattscheibe Rekalked being second), and during broadcasts of the show on Friday nights, the hashtag #schlefaz regularly enters the German Twitter top ten charts, which has prompted German TV Guides and even Tele 5 themselves to adopt the Twitter hashtag as a semi-official name for the show, also used by show hosts Kalkofe and Rütten themselves. Rütten and Kalkofe made an ironic cameo appearance in the 2015 trash movie Sharknado 3: Oh Hell No! and the 2017 movie Sharknado 5: Global Swarming.

Since 2021 a spin-off with the most iconic movies was announced. The series called KulFaZ started in June 2022 with four films.

Start 
Oliver Kalkofe, together with Tele-5 station manager Kai Blasberg, developed the concept for the series in 2012. Since the Tele München Gruppe owns a large number of B-movies, e.g. of the production company The Asylum, which had already been broadcast on Tele 5, the idea of presenting them as trash television - in deliberate dissociation from the concepts of other broadcasters - matured. Thus, the title of the programme stands in contrast to the Kabel One slogan "The best films of all time".

The films are presented by the presenters during the broadcast and are provided with biting comments which are then cut in between.

Concept 
During the programme, films are presented which, according to the presenters, are considered particularly bad and therefore deserve special attention. One film is presented per programme and is examined in more detail.

At the beginning of each episode the viewer is prepared for the film by the presenters. Information about the actors, the director and other facts about the film are presented in a humorous way. In addition, a special cocktail is created or presented for each film, whose composition or name has a reference to the film. In connection with this, a drinking game is usually introduced. For example, the audience of the film Sharknado should drink a cocktail every time a flying shark is seen. During the film, pop-ups are used to provide background information on the respective scene or to remind viewers of the drinking game. After the commercial breaks, the presenters ironically discuss particularly prominent scenes of the film. At the end of the film, what has been seen is summarized and a conclusion is given. As the seasons progress, it has become established that Kalkofe is the incorrigible enthusiast who always gives the films an artistic touch, while Rütten plays the constantly pessimistic and disinterested viewer who almost without exception finds the film bad. Yet, the curse "Fickende Hölle! ("Fucking Hell!") has established itself as Rütten's catchphrase.

In 13 German cinemas (as of February 2014) the SchleFaZ series will be shown on the big screen simultaneously with the TV broadcast. The summer episodes of the 3rd season were simultaneously broadcast on Joiz Germany. First films of the series were released on DVD in June 2015.

Airing data 
Most of the Drinking Game are word plays and/or rhyme in German and therefore make little or no sense in English. So often the link goes to the disambiguation side of a word.

The Cocktail was not translated because of the word play.

Season 1

Season 2

Season 3 
Part of the 3. Season was the special on 29 February 2016 'Tag der Untoten' ("Day of the Undead") with the movies Vampirella and Blacula.

Season 4 
In March 2016 Tele 5 announced season 4, which includes twelve movies.

Season 5

Season 6 
Since all films have a rating of 12 years and up, the broadcast time was brought forward from about 22:15 to 20:15.

The winter season aired the sixth and last part of the Sharknado series.

♦ also: Anders ist besser (Different is better, slogan of Tele 5)

Season 7 
A Marvel film was presented at the beginning. The film premiered in Hamburg in the presence of the hosts before it was shown on Tele 5 at 10 pm. For the hundredth episode a big live event took place on September 28, 2019, at the Tempodrom in Berlin. The summer season opened on August 23, 2019, with "Plan 9 from Outer Space". This film is often mentioned when people ask for the worst film ever. It already celebrated its premiere in the Schlefaz version at the Filmfest München on June 29, 2019.

Season 8 
For the first time the spring season includes six movies. The summer season includes also six movies, the final in winter has four more.

The season also included a Halloween special on October 31, 2020, with the films Vampirella (season 3) and The Food of the Gods (season 6).

♦ In the original Version/homepage it is written "Hai as a Knight", but on the movie it was called "Kite"—which gives as the idea how it was meant. Second, in the movie Dr. Shayne Nichols is kite surfing.

♦ See also Rotor syndrome, a liver disease

Season 9 
On January 27, 2020, it was announced that a ninth season will be aired, beginning in spring. In calendar week 20, shots of new filming for the summer season were published on Twitter.

SchleFaZ 125 will be presented as preview as stream via the net. Special tickets for the event can be bought to interact with Oli and Päter while the film is presented.

The film list was announced on 23 June via Twitter as link to an article. On Twitter, 11th Oct., four scences for the upcoming winter season were announced and guessed. #ScheißfilmQuartett. "Ach jodel mir doch einen - Strosstrupp Venus bläst zum Angriff!; Roboshark; The Warrior And The Sorceress.

♦ also Tor (German) = goal in association football (de) and Thor

♠ World TV premiere of this movie

Season 10 
The season in 2022 was announced on Twitter at 0:50 am on New Year.
The tenth season starts at March, 18 with Super Mario Bros, Slavegirls, Rock 'n' Roll Nightmare and the Action-Horror-Thriller Grizzly II.

The return for the summer season was announced the day after the last spring movie was broadcast. Four moderations where shot in Mai.
On 13 July the start was announced on 9 September.
From footage of the shooting this movies were guessed:

 Gib Gas - Ich will Spaß! (1983)
 It Happened at Lakewood Manor (1977)
 Il boia scarlatto (Bloody Pit of Horror) (1965)
 The Norseman (1978)

On 29 July the eight movies have been promoted by Oliver Kalkofe on Twitter:

There will be no winter season because of the Football World Cup in Qatar from 21 November – 18 December. The autumn season will have eight movies.

♦ translation: whopper - LEO: Übersetzung im Englisch ⇔ Deutsch Wörterbuch

♥ also Bär (German) = bear

♠ World TV premiere of this movie

ℳ also Margarita

♣ aka "Kara Murat - Sein Kung-fu ist tödlich" and other, see https://www.nightmare-horrormovies.de/index.php?thread/13923-kara-murat-der-r%C3%A4cher-anatoliens/

Season 11 

On Februar, 8th the SchleFaZ account on Twitter announced the start of shooting of the moderation for the 11th season in calendar week 7. In four days the shooting for the four movies was done.

After showing stills for the movies the Twitter users could guess - and found Megaforce, Beerfest and the 150th will be Tammy and the T-Rex.

Guests 
In some episodes special guests appear in different ways.

 #36 Sharknado 3: Oh Hell No!: Olli Schulz, German singer-songwriter, actor and presenter
 #53 Sharknado: The 4th Awakens: Olli Schulz, German singer-songwriter, actor and presenter, Sarah Knappik who had a cameo in the movie
 #69 Sharknado 5: Global Swarming : Bela B, Olli Schulz, German singer-songwriter, actor and presenter
 #85 Sharknado 6: The Last One: Oliver Welke, Dietmar Wischmeyer, Bela B, Peter Flechtner, the voice actor of Ian Ziering, the main actor of the movie, Jörg Strombach, the producer of SchleFaZ, Sarah Knappik, Olli Schulz etc.
 #87 Der letzte Lude: Lotto King Karl as Andi Ommsen, main actor in the movie
 #100 Drei Engel auf der Todesinsel: Live show with Wolfgang Bahro, Bela B, Helmut Zerlett and the band (Jana König, ...), Christian Steiffen
 #111 Voyage of the Rock Aliens: Peter Illmann, hoster of 68 episodes of the ARD music program Formel Eins in 1983 and 1984
 #124 Angel's Höllenkommando: Bela B, bought for €20  as double for Peter (original statement from Bela B.)
 #125 Disco Godfather: Live show with Mola Adebisi, Peter Illmann, Helmut Zerlett and the band (Jana König, ...) with was streamed on July 10, 2021, as in cooperation between Cinema and Tele 5
 #141 Hai-Alarm auf Mallorca: Katy Karrenbauer, German actress, a main actress in the original movie
 #148 Gib Gas - Ich will Spaß!: Peter Illmann, Markus Mörl, the main actor of the original movie
 #150 Tammy & the T-Rex: live event in Berlin

Commercial success 
Even though Tele 5 is a small niche broadcaster, the SchleFaZ series is a commercial success.
A short list of the average viewing figures shows there exists a fanbase even of the late Friday night airtime.

Trivia 
 The series broadcast world TV premieres (sign: ♠)
 Daniel - Der Zauberer
 Sloane
 Grizzly II
 Tammy and the T-Rex
 Till now (August 2022) the worst rateted movie on IMDb is Daniel – Der Zauberer (1.2) from 14390 persons; the best rated movie is Zhōng Guó Chāo Rén (6.2) from 2082 people.
 There are 18 German movies in the list (12.1%).
 The Giant Claw is the oldest movie shown (1957), Grizzly II: The Predator is the newest (2020).
 German director Uwe Boll sent Tele 5 a video message on the occasion of the first season, thanking them for not showing any of his own films. After the first season, Boll suggested that his films would be presented in the programme, but Rütten and Kalkofe decided against it.
 Oliver Kalkofe stated in an interview by Peer Schader that the film Hercules in New York was in discussion for the programme, but was not permitted to be shown on TV because of Arnold Schwarzenegger's veto. On 8 May 2020, it was finally shown on Tele 5 after all, but as a warm-up film for SchleFaZ.
 The HanseMerkur Versicherungsgruppe has sponsored the summer seasons of SchleFaZ since 2016. Simultaneously with the broadcast, their official Twitter account humorously provides an insurance perspective on aspects in the shown movie and answers the often not entirely serious questions of users. Since 2017, the HanseMerkur news spokesman (nicknamed Hansi Merkur by the community) has been answering individual user questions on TV and on Twitter.

References

External links
 Kino bei CINEMA: Kinoprogramm, Filme, DVDs, Stars, Trailer und mehr - Cinema.de

German satirical television shows